Henson is a ghost town in Hinsdale County, Colorado, United States.  Its elevation is 9,235 feet (2,815 m). Henson's name has historically been spelled several different ways, including Hansen, Hanson, Hensen, and Honsen; the Board on Geographic Names officially supported the current spelling in 1896. Henson was named for Henson Creek, which was named for a pioneer settler.

Henson is the site of the Ute-Ulay Mine, now abandoned.

Climate
Climate type is dominated by the winter season, a long, bitterly cold period with short, clear days, relatively little precipitation mostly in the form of snow, and low humidity.  The Köppen Climate Classification sub-type for this climate is "Dfc" (Continental Subarctic Climate).

See also

 List of ghost towns in Colorado

References

External links

Hinsdale County, Colorado
Ghost towns in Colorado